Hoonah–Angoon Census Area is a census area located in the U.S. state of Alaska. As of the 2020 census, the population was 2,365, up from 2,150 in 2010. It is part of the unorganized borough and therefore has no borough seat. Its largest community is the city of Hoonah.

History

The census area was significantly larger in the 1990 census, at which time it was the Skagway–Yakutat–Angoon Census Area.  After Yakutat was incorporated as a consolidated-city borough on September 22, 1992, it was renamed Skagway–Hoonah–Angoon Census Area;  When Skagway followed suit on June 20, 2007, the census area assumed its current name.

Geography
A map showing its current boundaries is shown here:

Adjacent boroughs and census areas
 Yakutat City and Borough, Alaska – northwest
 Haines Borough, Alaska – northeast
 Juneau City and Borough, Alaska – northeast
 Petersburg Borough, Alaska – southeast
 Sitka City and Borough, Alaska – southwest
 Stikine Region, British Columbia – northwest, east
 Kitimat-Stikine Regional District, British Columbia – southeast

National protected areas 
 Glacier Bay National Park (part)
 Glacier Bay Wilderness (part)
 Tongass National Forest (part)
 Admiralty Island National Monument (part)
 Kootznoowoo Wilderness (part)
 Chuck River Wilderness
 Pleasant/Lemesurier/Inian Islands Wilderness
 Tracy Arm-Fords Terror Wilderness (part)
 West Chichagof-Yakobi Wilderness (part)

Demographics

Note: Demographic data below is for the former "Skagway–Hoonah–Angoon" Census Area, which still includes Skagway Borough.

As of the census of 2000, there were 3,436 people, 1,369 households, and 866 families residing in the census area.  The population density was 0.30 people per square mile (0.12/km2).  There are 2,108 housing units.  The racial makeup of the census area was 58.15% White, 0.15% Black or African American, 35.01% Native American, 0.38% Asian, 0.15% Pacific Islander, 0.96% from other races, and 5.21% from two or more races.  2.82% of the population were Hispanic or Latino of any race. 3.95% reported speaking Tlingit at home, while 1.83% speak Spanish  .

There were 1,369 households, out of which 30.80% had children under the age of 18 living with them, 49.30% were married couples living together, 8.40% had a female householder with no husband present, and 36.70% were non-families. 30.10% of all households were made up of individuals, and 5.60% had someone living alone who was 65 years of age or older.  The average household size was 2.50 and the average family size was 3.14.

In the census area, the population was spread out, with 26.80% under the age of 18, 7.10% from 18 to 24, 29.50% from 25 to 44, 29.30% from 45 to 64, and 7.30% who were 65 years of age or older. The median age was 38 years. For every 100 females, there were 116.40 males. For every 100 females age 18 and over, there were 120.70 males.

Politics
One of the most Democratic areas in Alaska, the Hoonah-Angoon Census Area has only voted for a Republican for president once (during the 2000 election).

Communities

Cities
 Angoon
 Gustavus
 Hoonah
 Pelican
 Tenakee Springs

Census-designated places
 Elfin Cove
 Game Creek
 Klukwan
 Whitestone Logging Camp

Other unincorporated places
 Cube Cove

See also
 List of airports in the Hoonah-Angoon Census Area

References

External links

 Skagway-Hoonah-Angoon Census Area map, 2000 census: Alaska Department of Labor
 Hoonah-Angoon Census Area map, 2010 census: Alaska Department of Labor
 Hoonah-Angoon Census Area map, January 2014: Alaska Department of Labor
 Alaska ShoreZone Coastal Mapping and Imagery

 
Alaska census areas